Caty McNally and Storm Sanders were the defending champions but chose not to participate.

Katarzyna Kawa and Aldila Sutjiadi won the title, defeating Sophie Chang and Angela Kulikov in the final, 6–1, 6–4.

Seeds

Draw

Draw

References
Main Draw

LTP Charleston Pro Tennis - Doubles